Al-Sammu'i was a Palestinian Arab village in the Safad Subdistrict. It was depopulated during the 1947–1948 Civil War in Mandatory Palestine on May 12, 1948, under Operation Hiram. It was located 4 km west of Safad. Today, Kfar Shamai is built on the site of the old village, and Amirim is built on the southern part of the village land.

In  1945, the village had a population of 310. Al-Sammu'i had a mosque and a shrine for a local sage known as al-Shaykh Muhammad al-'Ajami.

References

Bibliography 

 (pp. 200,  256) 
  (p. 455)
 
(p. 177)
 (Karmon, 1960, p. 165 )

  

 (p. 93)
 
 (p. 336, and  2nd appendix, p. 134)
  (p.  72)
 (p.  190)

External links
 Welcome To al-Sammu'i
al-Sammu'i,  Zochrot
 al-Sammu'i, Dr. Khalil Rizk
Survey of Western Palestine, Map 4: IAA, Wikimedia commons

Arab villages depopulated during the 1948 Arab–Israeli War
District of Safad